The 2021 season was the 107th in Sociedade Esportiva Palmeiras' existence. This season Palmeiras participated in the Campeonato Paulista, Copa Libertadores, Copa do Brasil, Série A, Recopa Sudamericana, Supercopa do Brasil and FIFA Club World Cup.

Squad information

Transfers

Transfers in

Transfers out

Competitions

Overview

Campeonato Paulista 

Palmeiras was drawn into Group C.

First stage

Quarter-final

Semi-final

Finals

Copa Libertadores

Group stage 

The draw for the group stage was held on 9 April 2021, 12:00 PYST (UTC−4), at the CONMEBOL Convention Centre in Luque, Paraguay.

Round of 16 

The draw for the round of 16 was held on 1 June 2021, 12:00 PYST (UTC−4), at the CONMEBOL Convention Centre in Luque, Paraguay.

Quarter-finals

Semi-finals

Final

Série A

Standings

Result by round

Matches

Copa do Brasil

Third round 
The draw for the third round was held on 23 April 2021 at CBF headquarters in Rio de Janeiro.

Recopa Sudamericana 

Palmeiras qualified for the 2021 Recopa Sudamericana by winning the 2020 Copa Libertadores.

Supercopa do Brasil 

Palmeiras qualified for the 2021 Supercopa do Brasil by winning the 2020 Copa do Brasil.

FIFA Club World Cup 

Palmeiras qualified for the 2021 FIFA Club World Cup by winning the 2021 Copa Libertadores.

Semi-final

Final

Statistics

Overall statistics

Goalscorers 
In italic players who left the team in mid-season.

External links 
 Official site

References 

2021
Palmeiras
Sociedade Esportiva Palmeiras